Thyridia is a monotypic genus of clearwing (ithomiine) butterflies, named by Jacob Hübner in 1816. Its only species is Thyridia psidii, the Melantho tigerwing or clapping ticlear. It is in the brush-footed butterfly family, Nymphalidae and is found in the Neotropical zone.

Subspecies
Arranged alphabetically:
T. p. aedesia Doubleday, [1847]
T. p. cetoides (Rosenberg & Talbot, 1914)
T. p. hippodamia (Fabricius, 1775)
T. p. ino C. & R. Felder, 1862
T. p. melantho Bates, 1866
T. p. pallida Godman & Salvin, 1898
T. p. psidii (Linnaeus, 1758)

References 

Ithomiini
Nymphalidae of South America
Nymphalidae genera
Taxa named by Jacob Hübner